Little Goose Creek is a creek originating on the east slope of the Big Horn Mountains in north-central Wyoming.

Route
Passing by the Bradford Brinton Memorial Museum and Art Gallery, the creek flows through Lions Park in Big Horn, Wyoming. Several miles downstream the creek flows through the Powder Horn Golf Course. Upon entering the town of Sheridan, Little Goose Creek enters a channel built by the Corps of Engineers in the 1940s.

Following the channel, the stream meets Big Goose Creek at Mill Park near the Sheridan County Fulmer Public Library, and becomes Goose Creek, which flows  and empties into the Tongue River, north of Sheridan.

References

External links 

Rivers of Wyoming
Tributaries of the Yellowstone River
Bodies of water of Sheridan County, Wyoming